Sean Conroy (born 1 June 1994 in Dublin) is an Irish professional squash player. As of March 2019, he is ranked number 124 in the world and number 1 in Ireland. He won the 2018 Bendigo International Squash Open PSA 5K professional tournament.

References

1994 births
Living people
Irish male squash players
Competitors at the 2022 World Games